José Ángel Antelo Paredes (born May 7, 1987) is a Spanish politician for Vox and a retired professional basketball player. Antelo, born in Santiago de Compostela, played as power forward.

Professional career
Antelo was formed in the young teams of Real Madrid. He played as professional player for the first time in the disappeared Cáceres CB at LEB Oro.

He played most of his career at this league and he only played two seasons at Liga ACB: in Bilbao Basket and Baloncesto Fuenlabrada.

After being nominated as the best national player of the 2011–12 LEB Oro season with Cáceres Patrimonio de la Humanidad, he signs with Liga ACB team UCAM Murcia.

On 27 March 2019, during the 2018–19 season and after spending seven years in Murcia, suffering several injuries, Antelo announced his retirement from the professional basketball.

National team career
Antelo played in all Spanish young teams, being with the U18 team champion of the FIBA Europe Under-18 Championship in 2004. In the same year, he also won the Albert Schweitzer Tournament played at Mannheim.

Political career
On 12 April 2019, right-wing party Vox announced his inclusion in the Murcian regional branch of the party.

On 4 December 2019, after being elected months before as councilor of the city of Murcia and after the dismissal of the main people of the party in the regional branch, Antelo was named president of the party's caretaker committee.

References

External links
FIBA Profile

1987 births
Living people
Baloncesto Fuenlabrada players
Basket Zaragoza players
Bilbao Basket players
Cáceres Ciudad del Baloncesto players
CB Murcia players
Liga ACB players
Power forwards (basketball)
Spanish men's basketball players
Sportspeople from Santiago de Compostela
CB L'Hospitalet players
Tenerife CB players
Vox (political party) politicians
Sportspeople from Murcia
Spanish municipal councillors
Politicians from the Region of Murcia
Sportsperson-politicians